Maaülikool is the quarterly magazine (formerly a newspaper) of the Estonian University of Life Sciences (Eesti Maaülikool).

External links
 Issues of the magazine since 2003

Magazines published in Estonia
Mass media in Tartu